Brightwell may refer to:

 Brightwell, Suffolk, England
 Brightwell Baldwin in Oxfordshire, England 
 Brightwell-cum-Sotwell in Oxfordshire (previously Berkshire), England 
 Brightwell (surname)